The METRO Q Card is a contactless smart card used to ride on public transportation in Greater Houston. It is administered by the Metropolitan Transit Authority of Harris County. The card can be used on METRO Bus, METRORail, and METROLift.  The cards are based upon the MIFARE Classic 1K standard and are freely available but expire.

Services
The following services use the Metro Q Card feature:
 METRORail
 METRO Bus
 METRO Lift

References

External links
 METRO Q Card - Ride Metro

Transportation in Houston
Contactless smart cards